Fiorenzo Stolfi (born 1956) was the Secretary of State for Foreign and Political Affairs and Secretary of State for Economic Planning of San Marino from July 27, 2006 to December 4, 2008. He previously held that position from December 2002 to December 2003, and before that he was the Secretary for Finance from June 2002 to December 2002.

Fiorenzo Stolfi, on 28 November 2011, denies all accusations of being the political reference, of the San Marino Connection, falling in Staffa Operation.

On 18 September 2012, Fiorenzo Stolfi was mentioned several times in the "Final Report of the Council Commission for the phenomenon of infiltration of organized crime with powers of investigation" prepared by the Sammarinese Anti-Mafia Commission.

External links
Fiorenzo Stolfi's address to the 61st session of the United Nations General Assembly, September 25, 2006
Fiorenzo Stolfi's address to the 63rd session of the United Nations General Assembly, September 25, 2008

References

1956 births
Living people
Secretaries of State for Foreign and Political Affairs of San Marino
Secretaries of State for Finance of San Marino
Secretaries of State for Interior of San Marino
Secretaries of State for Industry of San Marino
Secretaries of State for Tourism of San Marino